John Wilford (died 1418) of Exeter, Devon, was an English politician.

Family
Wilford was the brother of William Wilford, MP.

Career
He was a Member (MP) of the Parliament of England for Exeter in April 1414 and November 1414.

References

14th-century births
1418 deaths
English MPs April 1414
English MPs November 1414
Members of the Parliament of England (pre-1707) for Exeter